Marquette County may refer to:

 Marquette County, Michigan, U.S.
 Marquette County, Wisconsin, U.S.
 Marquette County, a historic county in Manitoba, Canada

See also